Prescott Community School District was a school district headquartered in Prescott, Iowa, United States. It had a single school, Prescott Community School.

History
The school building was built in 1914 and the district was established that year.

In the 1990s the Prescott district closed its secondary school and only served elementary school; it sent secondary students to other school districts.
 
In the 2014–2015 school year, the school's final year of operation, the elementary school had 34 students. In 2013 the members of the Prescott school board began discussing proposals to consolidate with other area school districts. The election determining whether the district would consolidate with the Creston Community School District was held on April 7, 2015. After the consolidation vote passed, the district property was put up for sale. The district was in operation for the 2015–2016 school year, but all of its students attended other districts' schools.

On July 1, 2016, the Prescott district merged into the Creston district.

Property

References

External links
 
 
 
 PRESCOTT COMMUNITY SCHOOL DISTRICT  INDEPENDENT AUDITOR'S REPORTS  BASIC FINANCIAL STATEMENTS AND   SUPPLEMENTARY INFORMATION  SCHEDULE OF FINDINGS June 30, 2006
 Map showing former Prescott district boundary shape

School districts established in 1914
1914 establishments in Iowa
School districts disestablished in 2016
2016 disestablishments in Iowa
Defunct school districts in Iowa